Queen of Outer Space is a 1958 American science fiction feature film shot in DeLuxe Color and CinemaScope. Produced by Ben Schwalb and directed by Edward Bernds, it stars Zsa Zsa Gabor, Eric Fleming, and Laurie Mitchell. The screenplay by Charles Beaumont, about a revolt against a cruel Venusian queen, is based on an idea supplied by Ben Hecht and originally titled Queen of the Universe. Upon its release, the film was promoted by Allied Artists and distributed to some locations as a double feature with Frankenstein 1970 starring Boris Karloff

Plot
In the year 1985, Captain Patterson (Eric Fleming) and his spaceship crew (Dave Willock, Patrick Waltz, and Paul Birch) take their rocketship to an Earth space station. En route, the space station is destroyed by an interstellar energy beam, which also damages their rocketship. The crewman crash land on Venus and are quickly captured. They learn the planet is under the dictatorship of the cruel Queen Yllana (Laurie Mitchell), a masked woman who has most men killed, keeping only male mathematicians and scientists on a prison colony moon orbiting Venus. In the queen's palace, the astronauts are aided by a beautiful courtier named Talleah (Zsa Zsa Gabor) and her Venusian friends (Lisa Davis, Barbara Darrow, and Marilyn Buferd). The women long for the love and attention of men again and plot to overthrow the evil queen to reestablish the "old order".

Once Patterson is alone with the masked queen in her bedchamber, he has the opportunity to remove the mask, revealing her horribly disfigured face. This was caused by radiation burns received during a war between Venus and the men of another planet "10 Earth years ago". Later, in a fury, the queen decides she must destroy Earth in order to protect her world and preserve her power. In the presence of her armed guards, Talleah and the crewmen can only watch as she aims the energy-beam "disintegrator" at Earth. Just after Yllana activates the weapon, Talleah's allies arrive and a struggle begins. The  disintegrator immediately begins to malfunction and finally explodes, killing Queen Yllana. Talleah becomes the new leader of Venus. At a subsequent ceremony, she announces that Patterson's rocketship has been repaired and that he and his crew can now return to Earth. Talleah's technicians have also repaired the "electronic televiewer", which allows space command on Earth to contact Patterson. Command orders him not to attempt a return but to remain on Venus for at least a year, until an Earth relief expedition can arrive. Although the crew could return home in their repaired spaceship, they are elated to follow orders and stay. They begin celebrating with the Venusians in a flurry of hugs and passionate kisses.

Cast

 Zsa Zsa Gabor as Talleah
 Eric Fleming as Captain Neal Patterson
 Dave Willock as Lt. Mike Cruze
 Laurie Mitchell as Queen Yllana
 Lisa Davis as Motiya
 Paul Birch as Professor Konrad
 Patrick Waltz as Lt. Larry Turner
 Barbara Darrow as Kaeel
 Marilyn Buferd as Odeena
 Mary Ford as Venusian 
 Marya Stevens as Venusian
 Laura Mason as Venusian 
 Lynn Cartwright as Venusian
 Kathy Marlowe as Venusian
 Coleen Drake as Venusian

Cast notes:
Also included in the cast are Guy Prescott as Colonel Ramsey (uncredited), Gerry Gaylor as the base commander, Ralph Gamble as the officer in the anteroom (uncredited), and Joi Lansing as an astronaut's girlfriend (uncredited). The Venusians are played by Tania Velia, Norma Young, Marjorie Durant, Brandy Bryan, Ruth Lewis, June McCall, and Marilyn Buferd, who was a former Miss America (1946). This was Buferd's final role in her decade-plus film career.

Production
The Three Stooges and the Bowery Boys director Edward Bernds recalled that, after producer Walter Wanger was released from prison for shooting agent Jennings Lang in the groin for having an affair with his wife Joan Bennett, Wanger could only find work at the low-rent Allied Artists (formerly Monogram Pictures). In 1952, Wanger brought a ten-page idea for a screenplay by Ben Hecht called Queen of the Universe that was a satirical look at a planet run by women. Several years later, with the idea of science fiction films being more common, Allied Artists revived the project with Wanger replaced on the film by Ben Schwalb, who was then producing the Bowery Boys films. Screenwriter Charles Beaumont did not think there was much in the Hecht screenplay, but Schwalb suggested spoofing the idea and had former Three Stooges screenwriter Ellwood Ullman touch up Beaumont's screenplay. Allied Artists retitled the film Queen of Outer Space as they thought the original title sounded more like a beauty pageant.

The central plot of a planet ruled by women was recycled from other science fiction features of the era, including Abbott and Costello Go to Mars (1953), Cat-Women of the Moon (1953), and Britain's Fire Maidens from Outer Space (1955). Queen of Outer Space also recycled many props, costumes, and other elements used in earlier films of the 1950s, most prominently the C-57D crewmen's uniforms, rayguns, and Altaira's wardrobe from Forbidden Planet (1956); models, sets, and special effects from Bernds' World Without End (1956); stock footage of an Atlas missile taking off; and a model rocketship built for Flight to Mars (1951). The model was also used by the Bowery Boys  in Paris Playboys (1954), which was co-written by Bernds and Ullman. It is noteworthy, too, that the queen's guards wore uniforms that foreshadow (and may have even influenced) those worn on the later Star Trek television series, coming in the same three Starfleet colors; red, blue, and gold.

In her 1991 autobiography One Lifetime is Not Enough, Gabor recounts a memorable line of her dialogue in the film and cites the production costs for creating the highly tailored fashions worn by her character:

Reception
In 1958, the film received generally positive reviews from critics in major newspapers and in trade publications. Most reviewers, including Charles Stinson of the Los Angeles Times, approached the film in their assessments as an amusing, mildly erotic parody or spoof, not as a true science fiction offering or even a faintly serious space adventure. In his November 13 review, Stinson characterizes the feature as "cheery frivolity" with "well-constructed cheesecake", all of which is visually punctuated by "luscious DeLuxe color". He even compliments Gabor's performance: 
Marjory Adams, writing for The Boston Globe, also recognized the Gabor vehicle as a "merry spoof of science fiction" that no one either on the screen or in theater audiences takes seriously, especially with regard to the actors' lines. "The dialogue", notes Adams, "is of the sort which might be written by a high school freshman", adding "the only unexpected twist is [Zsa Zsa] isn't the queen". Variety, for decades a leading trade publication in covering the United States' entertainment industry, simply deemed Queen of Outer Space as "a good-natured attempt to put some honest sex into science-fiction".

In Canada in 1958, Mike Helleur, a reviewer for Toronto's The Globe and Mail, compares the film's portrayal of life on Venus to "living backstage at the Folies Bergère", complete with light entertainment and rather scantily clad young women, who in this case take a "slapstick romp" through a Venusian queen's palace. One of several oddities that Helleur notices in the film is Gabor's singular identity among all the planet's inhabitants met by the Earthlings: "She is...the only girl in Outer Space with a Hungarian accent".

As of 2019, Rotten Tomatoes gives the film an approval rating of 18% based on reviews from 11 critics.

"Morally objectionable"
The trade publication Motion Picture Daily reported in 1958 that the National Legion of Decency objected to the content of Queen of Outer Space. In its October 3 issue, less than a month after the film's release, the magazine provides a few examples of the Legion's classification system for judging a Hollywood production's level of "decency":

See also
 List of American films of 1958
 List of films featuring space stations

References

External links
 
 
 
 
 

1958 films
1950s science fiction films
American science fiction films
American space adventure films
Venus in film
Films about astronauts
Films about extraterrestrial life
Films set in 1985
Films set in the future
Films directed by Edward Bernds
Allied Artists films
CinemaScope films
Films with screenplays by Charles Beaumont
Obscenity controversies in film
1950s English-language films
1950s American films